The 1947 All-Pro Team consisted of American football players who were chosen by various selectors for the All-Pro team for the 1947 football season. Teams were selected by, among others, the Associated Press (AP), the United Press (UP), Pro Football Illustrated, and the New York Daily News (NYDN). The AP selections included players from the National Football League (NFL) and All-America Football Conference; the UP, PFI, and NYDN selections were limited to players from the NFL.

Selections

References

All-Pro Teams
1947 National Football League season